Stronnictwo Pracy was a Polish Christian democratic political party, active from 1937 in the Second Polish Republic and later part of the Polish government in exile. Its founders and main activists were Wojciech Korfanty and Karol Popiel.

The party continued its operations as part of the Polish Underground State during World War II (when it was code-named Romb). Two politicians of the party served as heads of the Government Delegation for Poland, the civilian representatives of the Polish Underground State within occupied Poland, Cyryl Ratajski (1940–1942) and Jan Jankowski (1943–1945).

The party was disbanded in 1946, with the rise of the People's Republic of Poland. Some of its members remained active in the underground until the 1950s, while others joined the Democratic Party (Poland) (Stronnictwo Demokratyczne), an officially sanctioned "opposition" party in communist Poland, also described as a "satellite" party of the communist Polish United Workers' Party (PZPR).

In 1989, after the fall of communism in Poland, an attempt was made to revive the party under the name Christian Democratic Labour Party.

The party should be distinguished from the Labour Party (Partia Pracy) of the same period.

Election results

Sejm

See also
Front Morges

References

1937 establishments in Poland
1946 disestablishments in Poland
Catholic political parties
Centrist parties in Poland
Christian democratic parties in Europe
Conservative parties in Poland
Defunct political parties in Poland
Labour parties
Political parties disestablished in 1946
Political parties established in 1937